The 2017 season was the Carolina Panthers' 23rd in the National Football League and their seventh under head coach Ron Rivera. During the offseason, the team's notable free agent signings included Matt Kalil, Captain Munnerlyn and veteran Julius Peppers. Peppers previously spent his first eight seasons with the Panthers, appearing in Super Bowl XXXVIII with them. On July 17, 2017, the team announced Dave Gettleman had been relieved as general manager. His predecessor, Marty Hurney, was hired as interim GM a day later. For the first time since 2011, the Panthers did not play the Seattle Seahawks during the regular season. The Panthers rebounded after a disappointing 2016 campaign, where they were the defending NFC champions but finished 6–10 and last in the NFC South. 2017 saw the Panthers qualify for the playoffs with an 11–5 record. However, they lost to the Saints 31–26 in the Wild Card round.

Offseason

Signings

Releases

Draft

Notes
 The Panthers traded their third-round selection (No. 72 overall) and defensive end Kony Ealy to the New England Patriots for New England's second-round selection (No. 64 overall).

Staff

Final roster

Preseason

Regular season

Schedule

Note: Intra-division opponents are in bold text.

Game summaries

Week 1: at San Francisco 49ers

The Panthers started off their season by making their first return to Levi's Stadium since losing to the Denver Broncos in Super Bowl 50. Late in the first quarter Cam Newton threw a 40-yard touchdown to Russell Sheppard followed by a Graham Gano field goal. The Panthers scored six more points in the second quarter with two field goals. In the third Jonathan Stewart scored a touchdown, followed by another Gano field goal. With 3:14 left to go in the third quarter, Gano made his third field goal of the day making the score 23–0. Robbie Gould's kick with thirteen seconds to go gave the 49ers their first points of the game. Neither the Panthers or 49ers scored in the fourth quarter, resulting in Carolina defeating San Francisco 23–3. They improved to 1–0.

Week 2: vs. Buffalo Bills

In the Panthers home opener, Carolina's defense allowed only three points for the second straight week, and Graham Gano converted three field goals as the Panthers held on to defeat the Buffalo Bills 9–3 to remain undefeated. With seconds remaining in the game, Tyrod Taylor's 4th-and-11 pass sailed off diving rookie Zay Jones' fingertips, costing them the game winning touchdown. The Panthers improved to 2–0.

Week 3: vs. New Orleans Saints

The Saints were too much for the Panthers as they handed them their first loss of the season, 34–13. The Panthers fell to 2–1.

Week 4: at New England Patriots

In the first quarter, both Carolina and New England managed to only kick field goals. New England scored the first touchdown in the second quarter. Carolina answered with a touchdown by Fozzy Whittaker which tied the game again. The Patriots later scored with another Stephen Gostkowski field goal. Devin Funchess caught a ten-yard pass from Newton to give the Panthers a 17–13 lead. With four seconds remaining in the half Gostkowski kicked a 58-yard field goal, making the halftime score 17–16. Carolina had the only score in the third quarter with a Funchess touchdown but Gano missed the extra point. The Panthers started the fourth quarter with Cam Newton rushing for a touchdown, increasing the lead to 30–16. New England managed to score twice, tying the game at 30. With seconds left, Graham Gano kicked the game winning field goal. The Panthers won 33–30 (their first win in Foxborough since 1995) and improved to 3–1, which would also be their record against the Patriots since losing to them in Super Bowl XXXVIII in 2004.

Week 5: at Detroit Lions

Carolina and Detroit were tied with 3 points apiece at the end of the first quarter. Early in the second, the Lions scored a touchdown, making the score 3–10. The Panthers answered back with a Christian McCaffery touchdown, tying the game again. Devin Funchess scored a touchdown towards the end of the quarter, giving the Panthers a 17–10 lead. The Panthers started the second half with Cam Newton throwing a 31-yard touchdown pass to Kelvin Benjamin. Gano later made a 44-yard field goal to extend the lead to 27–10 going into the fourth quarter. Matthew Stafford threw a touchdown a pass to Fells, cutting the Panthers lead to 27–17. The Lions scored again with another Fells touchdown. The Panthers held on and won 27–24, improving to 4–1.

Week 6: vs. Philadelphia Eagles

On Thursday Night Football, both teams wore their Color Rush uniforms. The Eagles beat the Panthers 28–23, and Carolina fell to 4–2.

Week 7: at Chicago Bears

The Panthers lost for a second straight week by managing to score only one field goal in Chicago. The Bears beat Carolina 17–3, and they fell to 4–3.

Week 8: at Tampa Bay Buccaneers

The Panthers bounced back after a two-week losing streak, and beat their division rivals 17–3. Carolina improved to 5–3.

Week 9: vs. Atlanta Falcons

This was the Panthers' first game without wide receiver Kelvin Benjamin, who was traded to Buffalo days earlier. In this game, neither team scored in the same quarter. The Falcons were the only team to score in the first quarter, and led 10–0 going into the second. It was vice versa in the second, as Carolina scored two touchdowns for a four-point lead at the half. Atlanta was scoreless again in the third but Carolina scored on two Graham Gano field goals, making it 20–10. Atlanta had the only score of the fourth quarter, but Carolina survived and won 20–17. Their record improved to 6–3.

Week 10: vs. Miami Dolphins

In this Monday Night Football game, the Panthers beat the Dolphins 45–21 and improved to 7–3.

Week 12: at New York Jets

In the first quarter Carolina and New York scored only a field goal each. In the second quarter, Cam Newton scored a 1-yard touchdown but Graham Gano missed the extra point. Gano redeemed himself with another field goal, giving the Panthers a nine-point lead. Robby Anderson caught a 33-yard pass from Josh McCown, plus the extra point from Chandler Catanzaro, and Carolina led, 12–10. In the third New York scored a touchdown, and Jets led by 17–12. But Carolina answered with a Jonathan Stewart touchdown and took an 18–17 lead. Early in the fourth Catanzaro kicked a field goal, putting the Jets back on top, 20–18. Later the Panthers blitzed McCown and forced a fumble, which was recovered by Luke Kuechly who recovered it for a 34-yard touchdown. The Jets punted after their next drive fizzled and Kaelin Clay returned it 60 yards, making the score 32–20. Jermaine Kearse scored a touchdown for the Jets, and Catanzaro's extra point cut the Panthers' lead to 5. With 0:21 to go in the fourth quarter, Gano kicked a field goal and Carolina won by a final score of 35–27. The Panthers record improved to 8–3. Their win knocked the Jets and Giants out of playoff contention.

Week 13: at New Orleans Saints

The Panthers and Saints were tied at 7–7 going into the second quarter. Mark Ingram II scored a touchdown with a Wil Lutz extra point, and the Saints led by seven. The Saintsd score again to lead by 14. At the end of the second Christian McCaffery scored a touchdown, and with the extra point by Graham Gano, Carolina was down by seven at the half. Alvin Kamara scored a touchdown (Lutz kick) in the third, again increasing New Orleans' lead to 14 points. In the fourth quarter New Orleans scored 3 and Carolina scored 7. The Saints were too much for Carolina and won 31–21. Carolina fell to 8–4.

Week 14: vs. Minnesota Vikings

In a game featuring two of the NFC's best teams, Carolina was able to hold off the Vikings and win 31–24. The Panthers improved to 9–4.

Week 15: vs. Green Bay Packers

The Panthers spoiled Packers quarterback Aaron Rodgers' return by intercepting three passes and winning 31–24. They also improved to 10–4. A few hours after the game ended, owner Jerry Richardson announced he was putting the Panthers up for sale.

Week 16: vs. Tampa Bay Buccaneers

With the close win, the Panthers clinched a playoff spot for the fourth time in five years. They also improved to 11–4.

Week 17: at Atlanta Falcons

The Panthers went to Atlanta with a chance to win the NFC South. If Tampa Bay beat New Orleans and Carolina won, the Panthers would win the title. Despite Tampa's victory over the Saints, the Panthers lost 22–10, making the Saints NFC South champions. The Panthers ended the regular season with an 11–5 record.

Standings

Division

Conference

Postseason

NFC Wild Card Playoffs: at (4) New Orleans Saints 

Carolina looked to beat New Orleans for the first time all season. Carolina's defense played better than in the past games, holding the Saints dynamic running backs to under 100 yards combined. Saints quarterback Drew Brees threw a crucial interception late, but the Panthers comeback fell just short and they lost 26–31. The Panthers ended the Wild Card Weekend with an 11–6 record.

References

External links
 

Carolina
Carolina Panthers seasons
Carolina Panthers